is  the former head coach of the Kagoshima Rebnise in the Japanese B.League.

Head coaching record

|-
| style="text-align:left;"|Renova Kagoshima
| style="text-align:left;"|2008-09
| 14||3||11|||| style="text-align:center;"|7th in JBL2|||-||-||-||
| style="text-align:center;"|-
|- 
| style="text-align:left;"|Renova Kagoshima
| style="text-align:left;"|2009-10
| 21||6||15|||| style="text-align:center;"|6th in JBL2|||-||-||-||
| style="text-align:center;"|-
|- 
| style="text-align:left;"|Renova Kagoshima
| style="text-align:left;"|2010-11
| 23||11||12|||| style="text-align:center;"|4th in JBL2|||-||-||-||
| style="text-align:center;"|-
|- 
| style="text-align:left;"|Renova Kagoshima
| style="text-align:left;"|2011-12
| 27||18||9|||| style="text-align:center;"|3rd in JBL2|||2||0||2||
| style="text-align:center;"|4th in JBL2
|- 
| style="text-align:left;"|Renova Kagoshima
| style="text-align:left;"|2015-16
| 36||6||30|||| style="text-align:center;"|9th in NBDL|||-||-||-||
| style="text-align:center;"|-
|- 
| style="text-align:left;"|Kagoshima Rebnise
| style="background-color:#FFCCCC" "text-align:left;"|2016-17
| 60||7||53|||| style="text-align:center;"|6th in B2 Western|||-||-||-||
| style="text-align:center;"|relegated to B3
|-

References

1955 births
Living people

Japanese basketball coaches
Kagoshima Rebnise coaches
Kyushu University alumni
People from Kagoshima